2-Hydroxybutyric acid, is a hydroxybutyric acid with the hydroxyl group on the carbon adjacent to the carboxyl. It is a chiral compound having two enantiomers, D-2-hydroxybutyric acid and L-2-hydroxybutyric acid. Its conjugate base is known as alpha-hydroxybutyrate and α-hydroxybutyrate.

2-Hydroxybutyrate, the conjugate base of 2-hydroxybutyric acid, is produced in mammalian tissues (principally hepatic) that catabolize L-threonine or synthesize glutathione. Oxidative stress or detoxification demands can dramatically increase the rate of hepatic glutathione synthesis. Under such metabolic stress conditions, supplies of L-cysteine for glutathione synthesis become limiting, so homocysteine is diverted from the transmethylation pathway forming methionine into the transsulfuration pathway forming cystathionine. 2-Hydroxybutyrate is released as a byproduct when cystathionine is cleaved to cysteine that is incorporated into glutathione. Chronic shifts in the rate of glutathione synthesis may be reflected by urinary excretion of 2-hydroxybutyrate.

α-hydroxybutyrate may be useful as an early indicator of insulin resistance in non-diabetic subjects. Moreover, elevated serum α-hydroxybutyrate predicts worsening glucose tolerance.

References

Alpha hydroxy acids